Pylle railway station was a station on the Highbridge branch of the Somerset and Dorset Joint Railway. Opened 3 February 1862 on the original S&DJR main line, the railway was reduced to branch status when the extension from Evercreech Junction to Bath was opened. It was built with a passing loop on the single line however the loop was removed in 1929 at the same time as the signal box.  It was reduced to halt status on 4 November 1957 and closed with the railway, on 7 March 1966.

Reading

References

External links
http://www.sdjr.net/locations/pylle.html
 Station on navigable O.S. map

Disused railway stations in Somerset
Former Somerset and Dorset Joint Railway stations
Railway stations in Great Britain opened in 1862
Railway stations in Great Britain closed in 1966
Beeching closures in England
1862 establishments in England